Hyposmocoma pseudolita is a species of moth of the family Cosmopterigidae. It was first described by Lord Walsingham in 1907. It is endemic to the Hawaiian island of Oahu and possibly the islands of Molokai and Hawaii.

The type locality is the Waianae Range.

External links

pseudolita
Endemic moths of Hawaii
Biota of Oahu
Waianae Range
Moths described in 1907
Taxa named by Thomas de Grey, 6th Baron Walsingham